Fuping is a county of west-central Hebei province, China, bordering Wutai County, Shanxi to the west. During December 29–30, 2012 there was a nationally televised visit by Xi Jinping to the villages of Luotuowan and Gujiatai in Longquanguan township which illustrated rural poverty in China. The residents, corn farmers, have an average per capita annual income of $160. Average income for the county as a whole is 2,400 yuan ($390). Following the telecast there was a generous outpouring of aid by the Chinese public to the village. The government has pledged $40 million to Luotuowan and other villages in Fuping County.

Civil war
Fuping County was a revolutionary base during the Chinese Civil War.

Administrative divisions
There are 5 towns and 8 townships under the county's administration.

Towns:
Fuping, Longquanguan, Pingyang, Chengnanzhuang, Tianshengqiao

Townships:
Wanglinkou Township, Taiyu Township, Datai Township, Shijiazhai Township, Shawo Township, Wuwangkou Township, Xiazhuang Township, Beiguoyuan Township

Climate

Transportation 
China National Highway 207

Notes

Geography of Baoding
County-level divisions of Hebei